Luge at the 1972 Winter Olympics consisted of three events at Sapporo Teine.  The competition took place between 4 and 7 February 1972.

Medal summary

Medal table

East Germany led the medal table with eight medals, including three golds. The only non East-German medal came in the doubles, where Italy tied the Germans, with both teams receiving gold medals.

Events

Participating NOCs
Thirteen nations participated in Luge at the Sapporo Games. Japan and the Soviet Union made their Olympic luge debut.

References

 
1972
1972 Winter Olympics events
1972 in luge